Chalongphob Sussangkarn (born 1950) is a Thai economist. He was the President of the Thailand Development Research Institute and later served as  Minister of Finance in Surayud Chulanont's military junta. An ethnic Chinese of Hainanese origin, He replaced Pridiyathorn Devakula after Pridiyathorn abruptly resigned. Chalongphob joined several other TDRI-affiliated individuals who had Cabinet-level seats in the junta, including Deputy Prime Minister and Industry Minister Kosit Panpiemras and Energy Minister Piyasvasti Amranand.  Prior to joining the cabinet, Chalongphob had no experience in government and was an economist.

Biography

Education and career
Chalongphob received BA and PhD degrees from the University of Cambridge. After graduation, he taught at the Department of Economics at the University of California, Berkeley during 1977–79. He later joined the World Bank in Washington, D.C., where he served from 1979 to 1985. He then returned to Thailand to work as an economist at the  Thailand Development Research Institute (TDRI). Dr. Sussangkarn served as the President of TDRI from 1996 up until 2007. He resigned from his post in early March 2007 in order to accept appointment as finance minister, replacing Pridiyathorn Devakula, who abruptly resigned.  In February 2008, Sussangkarn returned to the TDRI to work as a researcher.

Policies

Chalongphob's policy stance was pro-business, and included:
Being against the Surayud government's capital control policy,
Support for greater liberalization of foreign investment in Thailand, and
Being against the Thaksin government's populist economic policies.

References
Online Profile
TDRI
"Chalongphob is appointed as new finance minister." The Nation 03-07-2007
"Test Times." The Nation 03-07-2007

External links
 whoswho-thailand.com page for Chalongphob Sussangkarn

Sussangkarn, Chalongphob
Sussangkarn, Chalongphob
Sussangkarn, Chalongphob
Chalongphob Sussangkarn
Sussangkarn, Chalongphob
Chalongphob Sussangkarn
Chalongphob Sussangkarn
Chalongphob Sussangkarn